The 2015 Toronto FC season was the ninth season in club history. On October 14, the team qualified for the playoffs for the first time in franchise history. The club began the season with a seven match road trip due to ongoing renovations at BMO Field. Their first home game was played May 10 against the Houston Dynamo, more than two months into the season.

Background 

During the 2014 season, Toronto FC finished seventh out of ten teams in the Eastern Conference.

On 12 July 2015, Giovinco achieved Toronto FC's first ever hat-trick in MLS play against New York City FC in a 4–4 draw at Yankee Stadium, and set up the fourth goal during the match, also missing a penalty. It was also the third fastest hat trick scored in the league's history at 9 minutes. Following the match, he received the player of the week award for the third time in the 2015 MLS season.

Squad 

As of the end of the season.

Transfers

In

Draft picks 
Draft picks are not automatically signed to the team roster. Only those who are signed to a contract will be listed as transfers in. Only trades involving draft picks and executed after the start of 2015 MLS SuperDraft will be listed in the notes.

Out

Loan out

Competitions

Preseason

Major League Soccer

League tables

Eastern Conference

Overall

Results summary

Results by round

Matches

MLS Cup Playoffs

Canadian Championship

Mid-season friendlies

Statistics

Squad and statistics 

|-
|colspan="12"|Players who appeared for Toronto but left during the season:

|}

Goals and assists 
Correct as of October 29, 2015

Clean sheets 
Includes all competitive matches.
Correct as of October 29, 2015

Disciplinary record 
Correct as of October 29, 2015

Recognition

MLS Team of the Week

MLS Player of the Week

MLS Goal of the Week

MLS Player of the Month

End of Season awards

References

External links 
2015 Toronto FC season at Official Site

Toronto FC seasons
Toronto FC
Tor
Toronto FC